Ephysteris iberica is a moth of the family Gelechiidae. It was described by Povolný in 1977. It is found in Croatia, Greece, France, Spain and on Sicily and Malta. Outside of Europe, it has been recorded from Israel.

References

Moths described in 1977
Ephysteris
Moths of Europe